The 1976–77 OB I bajnokság season was the 40th season of the OB I bajnokság, the top level of ice hockey in Hungary. Four teams participated in the league, and Ferencvarosi TC won the championship.

Regular season

External links
 Season on hockeyarchives.info

Hun
OB I bajnoksag seasons
1976–77 in Hungarian ice hockey